Wahlenbergia littoricola is a small herbaceous plant in the family Campanulaceae native to Western Australia.

It blooms between January and October producing blue flowers.

The species is found in the South West region of Western Australia where it grows in clay-loam soils around conglomerate rocks.

The flowers of the indigenous plant are often used an additive to create a purple-colored paint by artists.

References

littoricola
Eudicots of Western Australia
Plants described in 1986
Endemic flora of Western Australia